James Peter Kent  (born July 27, 1943) is a former Canadian journalist and former politician who served as the Conservative Member of Parliament for the riding of Thornhill from 2008 to 2021. He served as Minister of the Environment in the government of Prime Minister Stephen Harper. Before entering politics, he was Deputy Editor of the Global Television Network, a Canadian TV network. He has worked as a news editor, producer, foreign correspondent, and news anchorman on Canadian and American television networks.

Background
Kent was born in Sussex, England in a Canadian Army hospital. Both his parents were serving with the Canadian Army. The family moved to Canada and, after a period in Ottawa, settled in Medicine Hat, Alberta. His parents were Aileen Marie (née Fears) and Arthur Parker Kent, both now deceased. The elder Kent was a long-time employee of the Southam Newspaper Group who retired as associate editor of the Calgary Herald. Peter Kent's younger brother, Arthur, is also a journalist, known in the first Gulf War as the "scud stud". Kent has three sisters: Adele, Norma and Susan. Norma was a local news anchor at CBC Windsor for a number of years before becoming co-host of the CBC consumer affairs programme Marketplace.  She continues to work as a journalist. Susan Kent Davidson died of cancer in 2014. She was a writer and book editor, a committed member of the New Democratic Party, and the widow of the UTP editor Rik Davidson.

Peter Kent is married to Cilla, a former print journalist with South Africa's Argus newspaper group (a Cape Town paper now part of the Irish-based Independent News & Media) for over 26 years. They have a daughter, Trilby, who published her first novel, Medina Hill, in October 2009.

Kent was a member of the board of Canadian Coalition for Democracies and has represented them at public events such as a demonstration supporting publication of the controversial Muhammed cartoons.

Kent is a member of the Canadian Broadcast Hall of Fame and a past member of the Board of the Academy of Canadian Cinema and Television. He is also a Founding Supporter of Canadians for Defence and Security and was a member of the board of the revitalized ParticipACTION. He was a board member of the pro-Israel media advocacy group Honest Reporting Canada, and co-Chair of Ontario Cabinet for the Canadian Museum for Human Rights.

Journalism

Kent began his career as a radio journalist in the early 1960s. He then moved to television, joining Calgary station CFCN-TV in 1965 and subsequently worked for CBC Television, CTV, Global, NBC and The Christian Science Monitor's television newscast.

In 1966, he went to South East Asia to cover the Vietnam War as a freelance foreign correspondent. He stayed on to cover the final withdrawal of US troops from Vietnam in 1973 and covered the fall of Cambodia to the Khmer Rouge in 1975. Kent returned to Canada and worked as a producer for CBC's The National and, in 1976, he became the broadcast's anchorman after Lloyd Robertson moved to CTV News.

In 1978 Kent agreed to step down as anchorman of The National after he submitted an intervention to the Canadian Radio-television and Telecommunications Commission (CRTC) recommending that the corporation's licence not be renewed until management created procedures and protocols to prevent political interference in the CBC's editorial decision-making. Kent's complaint involved messages conveyed through the then CBC President Al Johnson from the Prime Minister's Office that resulted in cancellation of a speech by Premier René Lévesque and coverage of a speech by Prime Minister Pierre Trudeau. As a result of his intervention and descent from The National anchor desk, Kent accepted assignment to the newly created African Bureau of the CBC, located in Johannesburg.

The CBC subsequently created protocols to govern Prime Ministerial access to the public broadcaster. They remain in effect today, and the most recent example was the speech made to the country by Prime Minister Jean Chrétien on the eve of the 1995 Quebec referendum. Kent returned briefly in 1978 to testify at a grievance hearing initiated by an unsuccessful anchor candidate who complained that Knowlton Nash, the vice-president of CBC News, had appointed himself to succeed Kent. In that testimony Kent—the first journalist to anchor The National—supported Nash's credentials.

Kent returned to Canada and the CBC in 1982 as a founding producer, correspondent and occasional co-host of The Journal, hosted by Barbara Frum and Mary Lou Finlay.

On January 24, 1984, the CBC television program The Journal broadcast a full edition documentary called "The Greenhouse Effect and Planet Earth," hosted, narrated and written by Kent. Broadcast more than 27 years ago, this may be one of the first major media reports on the subject. Kent concluded with these words: "The greenhouse effect must be considered as the world's greatest environmental concern."

In 1984 Kent moved to NBC serving in Miami, Washington and New York bureaus and as the US network's senior European correspondent in the late 1980s, winning four Emmy nominations with the network. He then reported for and was back-up anchorman for John Hart and John Palmer at The Christian Science Monitor'''s World Monitor television news service.  One of Kent's feature report series - on challenges in American inner cities - was awarded the Robert F. Kennedy Award.

In 1987, Peter Kent was a reporter on the team that produced the documentary “Six Days Plus 20 Years: A Dream Is Dying” which was condemned by both the Israeli left and right, including Premier Yitzhak Shamir, Foreign Minister Shimon Peres and Defense Minister Yitzhak Rabin, who were some of several Israeli government officials who refused to engage with NBC for a period of time afterwards. Kent returned to Canada to join Global News in 1992, and was the anchorman of its flagship news program First National until 2001. He then anchored the business news show MoneyWise'' on Global and Prime.

Political career

Early political career
In the 2006 federal election, Kent ran as the Conservative Party of Canada candidate in the Toronto riding of St. Paul's. He placed second with 25.76% of the vote against the incumbent, Carolyn Bennett of the Liberals (50.25%), and ahead of Paul Summerville of the New Democratic Party (19.19%).

Kent ran again for the Conservatives in the 2008 election, this time in the riding of Thornhill, and was elected, defeating incumbent Susan Kadis by 5200 votes.

Kent was named to the junior cabinet post of Minister of State of Foreign Affairs (Americas) several weeks after the election. In an interview with journalist Steve Paikin on December 7, 2009, Kent acknowledged that as Minister, he is instructed to only use language vetted by the PMO, on occasion lifting Stephen Harper's statements from newspaper reports: "So when we're asked about the Israeli position on settlements, we never criticize Israel publicly. We say those settlements are 'unhelpful' in finding a comprehensive peace settlement. We've put on the record our position on nuclear power and India. We say 'it's no longer the 1970's, it's now 2009.' I saw the prime minister's quote in the newspapers to that effect yesterday, and so I used it today." Kent's comment that his government does not criticize Israel publicly was contradicted several months later by his senior minister, Lawrence Cannon, who went on record in the House of Commons "condemning" Israel's expansion of illegal settlements.

Minister of the Environment
In a cabinet shuffle on January 4, 2011, Kent was named Minister of the Environment.

In November 2011, Kent participated in the Durban Conference and in December of the same year announced that Canada would formally begin the process to withdraw from the Kyoto Protocol on climate change. Kent stated that “Kyoto, for Canada, is in the past,” predicted that other countries would also abandon Kyoto, and expressed his hope that a new agreement could be forged by 2015 that included the United States and China, the top two polluters. Kent claimed that the only way for Canada to avoid paying $14 billion of carbon offset penalties for failing to meet its Kyoto commitments was to withdraw, although there is no mechanism for fines in Kyoto, and Canada could have joined countries such as Japan that stayed in Kyoto without accepting new targets.

While defending the withdrawal from Kyoto during the December 14, 2011 session of the Canadian House of Commons, Kent criticized NDP Environment Critic Megan Leslie for not being at the Durban Conference despite his ministry having banned participation from all opposition MPs. During the heckling from opposition MPs over this statement, Justin Trudeau shouted "You piece of shit!" at Kent, but later apologized for losing his temper over Kent's statements regarding opposition participation in Durban. In December 2012, Canada became the first country to formally withdraw from the Kyoto Protocol.

As Minister of the Environment, Kent was a vocal supporter of the development of the oil sands, in line with the Conservative government's stated economic priorities.

In a CBC interview, Kent stated there is no evidence that the oil sands developments are polluting the Athabasca River.  His statement was later contrasted by a "secret" Environment Canada presentation released under FOI.  The presentation highlights contamination of the Athabasca River as a high-profile concern.  Citing elevated levels of pollutants near mining sites including hydrocarbons and heavy metals, possible effects on health of wildlife and downstream communities, and questioning current government data which is unable to generate a "big picture" view of impacts on the ecosystem.

Kent was an advocate of improving the Species At Risk Act, in particular making it apply to whole ecosystems rather than just individual species.

Legacy

Kent was demoted from cabinet in the summer of 2013, shortly after his 70th birthday, in a cabinet shuffle which Prime Minister Harper described “generational change” in order to make room for younger MPs to become ministers. He has been described by some critics such as environmentalist Rick Smith as  “Canada’s Worst Environment Minister Ever” for allegedly being a "green rubber stamp for destructive, ill-considered, industrial behaviour, all while glibly blaming “foreign interests” for meddling with Canada's overwhelmingly foreign-owned oil and gas sector" by restricting the ability of environmental assessment to limit pipeline construction, walking away from the Kyoto Protocol after the country had signed it, reducing protection for lakes and rivers, disbanding the National Round Table on the Environment and the Economy on the basis NRTEE had become an anachronistic entity.

Kent has named his accomplishments as being wastewater regulation, changes to the Species at Risk Act and overseeing greenhouse gas regulations for vehicle emissions, regulation of Canada's coal-fired electricity sector and banning the construction of any new coal-fired generating units.  He regrets he was unable to convince cabinet colleagues to implement greenhouse gas regulations for the oil and gas industry.

Backbench
As a backbench MP, Kent has called on the government to fund HPV vaccinations for boys, in addition to current vaccination programs for girls, after he survived a bout with throat and tongue cancer at the end of 2013. He also criticized the Harper government for drawing up an "enemies list" of  uncooperative bureaucrats and hostile stakeholders.

Prior to his demotion from cabinet, Kent stated his intention of running in the 2015 federal election. During the election campaign, Kent tweeted a photo that falsely shows an ISIS fighter posing as a refugee to bolster his argument for "refugee screening". After the claim was debunked, Kent retracted and deleted the tweet.

Kent has since been re-elected in both the 2015 and 2019 elections. He announced on November 23, 2020, that he would not be running in the next federal election. He left office on August 15, 2021, when parliament was dissolved for the 2021 Canadian federal election.

Electoral record

References

External links
 Peter Kent official site

1943 births
Canadian television news anchors
Canadian television reporters and correspondents
NBC News people
Conservative Party of Canada MPs
English emigrants to Canada
Global Television Network people
Living people
Members of the 28th Canadian Ministry
Members of the House of Commons of Canada from Ontario
Members of the King's Privy Council for Canada
People from Sussex
People from Thornhill, Ontario
CBC Television people
CTV Television Network people
20th-century Canadian journalists
21st-century Canadian journalists
The Christian Science Monitor people
War correspondents of the Vietnam War